Yudhishthira (Sanskrit: युधिष्ठिर, IAST: Yudhiṣṭhira) also known as Dharmaputra, is the eldest among the five Pandava brothers, the central figures of the ancient Hindu epic Mahabharata. He was the emperor of Indraprastha and later the Kuru Kingdom.

Yudhishthira was the son of Kunti, the first wife of King Pandu, fathered by the god Dharmadeva due to Pandu's inability to have children. Yudhishthira held a belief in dharma (morals and virtues) and was chosen to be the crown prince of Kuru. But after the Lakshagriha incident, he was presumed to be dead, and his cousin Duryodhana was appointed as the new heir. The kingdom was split in half due to a succession dispute between Yudhishthira and Duryodhana. Yudhishthira received the barren half, which he later transformed into the magnificent city of Indraprastha.

Yudhishthira and his brother had a polyamorous marriage with Draupadi, the princess of Panchala, who became the empress of the Indraprastha. After Yudhishthira performed the Rajasuya Yagna, he was invited to play a game of dice by his jealous cousin, Duryodhana and his uncle, Shakuni. Shakuni, a master at the game, represented Duryodhana against Yudhishthira and manipulated him into gambling his kingdom, wealth, the freedom of his brothers, Draupadi, and even himself. After the game, the Pandavas and Draupadi were sent into exile for thirteen years, with the last year requiring them to go incognito. During his exile, Yudhisthira was tested by his divine father Dharmadeva. For the last year of the exile, Yudhishthira disguised himself as Kanka and served the King of Matsya Kingdom.

Yudhishthira was the leader of the successful Pandava faction in the Kurukshetra War and defeated many venerable warriors such as Shalya. He then ruled the Kuru Kingdom for thirty six years until announcing his retirement. At the end of the epic, he was the only one among his brothers to ascend to heaven while retaining his mortal body.

Etymology

The word Yudhiṣṭhira is an aluk compound (meaning it preserves the case ending of its first part). It means "one who is steady in battle". It is composed of the words, yudhi (masculine locative singular) meaning "in battle"—from yudh (युध्) meaning 'battle, fighting'—and sthira (स्थिर) meaning 'steady'. His other names are:

 Bharata-vanshī (भरतवंशी) – descendant of Bharata
 Ajātashatru (अजातशत्रु) – one who is born without enemies
 Dharmanandana (धर्मनन्दन) or Dharmaputra (धर्मपुत्र) – The son of Dharma (Righteousness) or Yamraj
 Dharmarāja (धर्मराज) or Dharmarāya or Dharmaja – Lord of Dharma.
 Pānduputra (पांडुपुत्र) – Son of Pandu.
 Pāndavāgrajah (पाण्डवाग्रजः) – Eldest of Pandavas.
 Jyeshthakaunteya (ज्येष्ठकौन्तेय) – Eldest son of Kunti.
 Sārvabhauma (सार्वभौम) / Samrāt Chakravarti (सम्राट् चक्रवर्ती) – Emperor of the complete planet Earth.
 Kanka (कङ्क) – another name for Yudhisthira given by Draupadi for the 13th year in exile.

Birth and upbringing
Once a Brahmin rishi, Kindama and his wife were enjoying nature in the forest when Yudhishthira's father Pandu accidentally shot at them, mistaking them for deer. Before dying, Kindama cursed the king to die when he engages in intercourse with any woman. Due to this curse, Pandu was unable to become a father. As an additional penance for the murder, Pandu abdicated the throne of Hastinapura, and his blind brother Dhritarashtra took over the reins of the kingdom.

After knowing the curse of Pandu, Kunti told him that he could be the father of the child and told her boon of sage Durvasa. Then Pandu requested Kunti to apply her boon and suggested to call Dharma to get a truthful, knowledgeable and justice knowing son who can rule Hastinapur. On the full moon of May (Sanskrit: Jyeshth masa) first and the eldest of the Pandavas, Yudhishthira was born.

Yudhishthira's four younger brothers were Bhima, (born by invoking Vayu); Arjuna, (born by invoking Indra); and the twins Nakula and Sahadeva (born by invoking Aśvins). If Karna, the son of Kunti born before her marriage by invoking Surya, is counted, Yudhishthira would be the second-eldest of Kunti's children.

Yudhishthira was trained in religion, science, administration and military arts by the Kuru preceptors, Kripa and Drona. Specifically, he became a master in using the spear and war chariot. It is said that his spear was so strong that it could penetrate a stone wall as though it were a piece of paper. His chariot always flew at a 4 finger distance above the ground due to his piety.

Marriage and children

After Yudhishthira and his brothers had completed their studies, they returned to Hastinapura. Duryodhana along with Shakuni planned to kill them and sent Yudhishthira, his siblings and his mother to a palace made of lac, called Lakshagriha.

One night, Shakuni's man, Purochana set it on fire. However,  the princes and their mother survived. They were heartbroken and decided to hide from Hastinapura. Later, Arjuna attended Draupadi's swayamvar and won her hand in marriage. But due to Kunti's misunderstanding, Draupadi became the common wife of all the Pandavas.  Later at Indraprastha, Draupadi bore Yudhishthira a son, Prativindhya and a daughter Suthanu. Suthanu was later married to Asvabhanu, Krishna and Satyabhama's eldest son. Although Yudhishthira had another wife named Devika, Draupadi was his chief consort as well as the empress.

Yudhishthira was married to Devika in a self-choice marriage ceremony, arranged by her father Govasena, who was the king of Sivi Kingdom. They had a son, Yaudheya. According to Puranas, Yaudheya was also the name of the son of Prativindhya. The Bhagavata Purana, as well as Vishnu Purana, also mention Pauravi as one of the wives of Yudhishthira. A son named Devaka was born to this couple.

Ruling the Indraprastha

Division of Hastinapura
When the Pandavas returned to Hastinapura after hiding, there was conflict between Yudhishthira and Duryodhana regarding as the crown prince of Hastinapura. Yudhishthira was originally made the crown prince of Hastinapura, but after the event of Lakshagriha, people thought that he was dead, and Duryodhana was made the new crown prince of Hastinapura.  On Bhishma's advice, Dhritarashtra gave half of the kingdom to Pandavas to rule. However the land was under the control of Takshaka. Pandavas defeated Takshaka and with the help of Mayasura, they built a magnificent city named Indraprastha.

Rajasuya yajna

Some years after his coronation at Indraprastha, Yudhishthira set out to perform the Rajasuya yagna.

Arjuna, Bhima, Nakula, and Sahadeva led armies across the four corners of the world to obtain tributes from all kingdoms for Yudhishthira's sacrifice. The non-compliant Magadha king, Jarasandha was defeated by Bhima and Krishna. At his sacrifice, Yudhishthira chose Krishna as his honored guest. At the yajna, many kings were present there, including Duryodhana and Shishupala. Shishupala was beheaded by Krishna for his evil deeds. An annoyed and jealous Duryodhana returned to Hastinapura.

The game of dice

Yudhishthira was challenged to play a game of dice in Hastinapura by his cousin, Duryodhana. Duryodhana invited him because he was jealous of Yudhishthira's wealth and power that he witnessed at the Rajasuya. Shakuni used the dice made from the bones of his father, which always ensured that he got the number he wanted and Yudhisthira was allowed to bet whatever he had he was proud of and had right over. After losing his brothers and his empire, he bet himself and also his wife which lead to the Vastraharan. Later, he lost his kingdom in the game again and was forced into exile for 13 years, which included one year in anonymity.

Exile

Yaksha Prashna

During their exile, the 4 other Pandavas happened upon a lake, which was haunted by a Yaksha. The Yaksha challenged the brothers to answer his moral questions before drinking the water; the four Pandavas laughed and drank the water anyway. As a result, they choked on the water and died. Yudhishthira went in last, answered many questions put forth to him by the Yaksha and revived his brothers. He asked for any other wish as he was impressed and told him he could ask for wealth, strength, power, anything he wished. Yudhishthira said he already got the strength, wealth and power when all his four brothers were revived and said he could not ask for any other wish. Sahadeva said if you do not use this wish, we might be in trouble in the future. Arjuna knowing that his brother Sahadeva knows the future told Yudhishthira to ask another wish. Bhima and Nakula also knew that Sahadeva and Arjuna were very smart and told him to use his wish. Later Yama, his father told him to ask for a wish. Yudhishthira said, "Asking for 1 or 2 boons is not being greedy but asking for 3 or more boons is being greedy and it is one of the gravest sins. My brothers are insisting me to ask for a wish and the person who is ready to give me a boon, my father also wants me to ask for another boon. I do not ask for being the wealthiest man nor being the most powerful man. All I ask is that me, my brothers and Draupadi should not be recognized during the 13th year of exile."This story is often cited as an example of Yudhishthira's upright principles. The Yaksha later identified himself as Yudhishthira's father, Dharma and pointed them to the kingdom of Matsya to spend their last year in exile anonymously.

Ajñātavāsa (Incognito) 
Along with his brothers, Yudhishthira spent his last year of exile in the kingdom of Matsya. He disguised himself as a Brahmin named Kank (among themselves Pandavas called him Jaya) and taught the game of dice to the king.

Kurukshetra war

When the period of exile was completed, Duryodhana refused to return Yudhishthira's kingdom. Yudhishthira made numerous diplomatic efforts to retrieve his kingdom peacefully but in vain. He was convinced by Krishna to wage war.

The flag of Yudhishthira's chariot bore the image of a golden Moon with planets around it. Two large and beautiful kettle-drums, called Nanda and Upananda, were tied to it. Before the war started, Yudhishthira stepped down from his chariot to take blessings from his grandsire Bhishma, teachers Drona and Kripa and uncle Shalya, who all were in his opposite side in the war showing his respect towards his elders. He also asked the willing Kauravas to join his side. On his request one of Dhritarashtra sons, Yuyutsu joined the war on the side of Pandavas.

Yudhishthira was described to be an excellent car-warrior and a master at spear-fighting. Yudhishthira’s spear was called Shakti. Yudhishthira defeated many warriors in the War, like Duryodhana.

On the first day, he fights with Shalya and wounds him. On the 14th day of the war when Arjuna was busy in searching Jayadratha. Drona decided to capture him as Arjuna repelled Drona's plan of capturing Yudhishthira. Yudhishthira and Drona engaged in a fierce duel where Yudhishthira defeated Drona on a spear fight. Ashwathama came in aid of his father and too got defeated and the latter fled away. 
On the night of the 14th day, he tried to stop Duryodhana as he was inflicting heavy casualties on the Pandava army. However, an enraged Duryodhana severely wounds Yudishthira. But before being taken away from the battlefield Yudishthira wounds Duryodhana and make him unconscious as well. 
On the fifteenth day of the war,
Yudhishthira defeated major warriors like Kritavarma and Dushasana and Yudhishthira was approached by Drona, the Kauravas' then-Supreme Commander and his mentor, in the latter' inquiry on the death of his son Ashwatthama when he heard the name claimed to have died at Bhima's hand. Torn between his duty to cripple Drona and upholding his moral, Yudhishthira opted to half truth where he confirmed the death of Ashwatthama the elephant, but omitted the contextual part that it was an elephant and not the Bhrama's son. This was effective in the former purpose of crippling Drona, but also caused his own chariot to finally fall down to the ground, instead of slightly levitating as it had been before this incident. On the Sixteenth day, he faced Duryodhana and got a good fight. However, Yudishthira soon destroyed Duryodhana's chariot and put him to flight.

On the seventeenth day, he injured Duryodhana badly and about to kill him and Karna came in aid of his friend and defeated Yudhishthira.

On the last day of the war, Yudhishthira killed Madra king Shalya and his brother Madrasena. It is said that Yudhishthira was highly energetic for the day, and engaged in a fierce duel against the Kauravas' final supreme commander, before slaying his uncle.

With the battlefield cleared of the Kauravas but no sight of Duryodhana, Yudhishthira received a report that his nemesis went into hiding in a nearby swamp. The Pandavas brothers and Krishna thus went to the swamp, and taunted Duryodhana off his refuge. Yudhishthira proposed a final challenge to Duryodhana, to a battle against any of the Pandavas under any weapon of Duryodhana's desire.

With Duryodhana choosing Bhima, the other Pandavas brothers, Krishna and Balarama witnessed the mace duel between the mace fighters. When Bhima finally defeated Duryodhana ad started insulting his nemesis, Yudhishthira became sufficiently displeased with his brother's disrespect and ordered Bhima off the battleground. Ultimately, Yudhishthira heard out Duryodhana's final conversation and lamentation, before leaving the fallen Kauravas' overlord on his deathbed.

Reign after the war

After getting victory in the war, Yudhishthira was crowned as the Emperor of Hastinapura for 36 years. He performed the ashvamedha on Krishna and Vyasa's insistence. In this sacrifice, a horse was released to wander for a year, and Yudhishthira's brother Arjuna led the Pandava army, following the horse. The kings of all the countries where the horse wandered were asked to submit to Yudhishthira's rule or face war. All paid tribute, once again establishing Yudhishthira as the undisputed Emperor of Bharatavarsha.

Retirement and ascent to heaven

Upon the onset of the Kali Yuga and the departure of Krishna, Yudhishthira and his brothers retired, leaving the throne to their only descendant to survive the war of Kurukshetra, Arjuna's grandson, Parikshit. Giving up all their belongings and ties, the Pandavas, accompanied by a dog, made their final journey of pilgrimage to the Himalayas. Among the Pandavas and Draupadi, one-by-one died on the way to reach the top, starting from Draupadi. Finally, it was Yudhishthira who was able to reach the top, with the dog accompanying him.

On reaching the top, Indra asked him to abandon the dog before entering the Heaven. But Yudhishthira refused to do so, citing the dog's unflinching loyalty as a reason. Indra said he let his family die, but Yudhishthira said he could not prevent their deaths, but to abandon a poor creature was a great sin. It turned out that the dog was his god-father Dharma Deva in disguise. He then went to heaven and found his Kaurava cousins but not his brothers and Draupadi. He asked Yamraj about this. Yamaraj took him to hell and told him of the sins of Pandavas and their wife. Yudhishthira decides that he would rather live in hell with good people than in heaven with bad people. This is another test and after this the Pandavas and Draupadi attain heaven.

There are three other stories relating to whether Yudhishthira went to heaven or hell.

In the first story he attains hell. While the Pandavas and Draupadi are walking to heaven, Draupadi and his brothers die one by one but Yudhishthira does not look back. He feels as if he has left all his mortal ties by not doing so. When he reaches heaven and does not find Draupadi and his brothers there but finds his Kaurava cousins he asks Yamaraj angrily about his brothers and wife. Yamaraj takes him to hell and tells him about his family's sins. Yudhishthira gets angry as he feels the sins of his family to be small compared to the sins of his cousins. Yamaraj tells him that since he has not renounced mortal  ties and is still angry at his cousins, he has attained hell.

In the second story he attains heaven. He reaches heaven and asks Yamaraj about his brothers and Draupadi politely and asks about his cousins as well. Yamaraj takes him to hell and tells him of his family's sins. Yamaraj tells Yudhishthira that he too had to experience hell once for his lie or half lie to Drona about Ashwathama's death. Other's believe it was because he hesitated to lie and thought of human rather than universal Dharma. Yamaraj assures Yudhishthira that his brothers and Draupadi will join him in heaven once they have atoned for their sins.

In the third story Yudhishthira attains heaven. He himself tells his brothers and Draupadi of their sins. When he has to go through hell he only questions how long he has to be there. He knew his sin. He eventually attains heaven with his brothers and Draupadi.

Yudhishthira's curse

After he was made aware that Karna was his elder brother, Yudhishthira cursed all women with not being able to hide any secrets. Had Yudhishthira's mother Kunti not kept that fact a secret, the war might have been averted, with millions spared.

Skills

He was master in spear-fighting and chariot racing. Yudhishthira was a polyglot, knowing unusual languages. He was known for his honesty, justice, sagacity, tolerance, good behavior and discernment.

Yudhishthira could burn down anyone into ashes when he sees someone with his wrath and anger. That's why he used to be calm and composed most of the time.
He closed his eyes and came out of the gambling hall even when he lost everything. Otherwise the entire Kuru sabha and all the one who were present would be burnt into ashes.

Dhritarashtra said to Sanjaya "The son of Kunti and Pandu, Yudhishthira, is virtuous and brave and eschews deeds that bring on shame. Endued with great energy, he hath been wronged by Duryodhana. If he were not high-minded, they would in wrath burn the Dhritarashtras. I do not so much dread Arjuna or Bhima or Krishna or the twin brothers as I dread the wrath of the king, O Suta, when his wrath is excited. His austerities are great; he is devoted to Brahmacharya practices. His heart's wishes will certainly be fulfilled. When I think of his wrath, O Sanjaya, and consider how just it is, I am filled with alarm."

Yudhishthira acquired deep spiritual knowledge from Lord Shiva and many prominent sages including Vyasa, Parashurama, Bhrigu, Savarni Manu, Narada, Markandeya, Asita Devala and Dhaumya.

In the media

Being an important person in the epic Mahabharata, Yudhishthira's role has been enacted by various actors over the years.

 In the Hindi film Draupadi (1931), Elizer played the character.
In the Tamil film Karnan (1964), Prem Kumar Played the character.
In the Telugu film Veerabhimanyu (1965), Dhulipala played the character.
In the Telugu film Daana Veera Soora Karna (1977), M. Prabhakar Reddy played the character.
In the Hindi television series Mahabharat (1988) and Mahabharat Katha (1997), Gajendra Chauhan portrayed the character.
 In the Hindi television series Shri Krishna (1993), Raman Khatri portrayed the character.
In the Hindi television series Ek Aur Mahabharat (1997), Virendra Singh played the character.
In the Hindi television series Draupadi (2001,) Arup Pal played the character.
 In the Hindi television series Mahabharat (2013), Rohit Bhardwaj portrayed the character.
 Manoj Bajpayee voiced the character in the Hindi animation film Mahabharat (2013).
In the Hindi television series Dharmakshetra (2014), Chandan K Anand played the character.
 In the Hindi television series Suryaputra Karn (2015), Kanan Malhotra played the role.
In the Kannada film Kurukshetra (2019), Shashi Kumar portrayed the character.
 Kanan Malhotra played the role of Yudhishthira once again, in the show RadhaKrishn.
 There is a red dragon in the Iron Realms Entertainment game Aetolia, The Midnight Age named Yudhishthira.
2022 Kannada film 777 Charlie is inspired from Yudhishthiras relationship with a dog during his ascent to heaven.

References

Bibliography

External links

 Persons and stories from Mahabharata

Characters in the Mahabharata
Entering heaven alive